Captain William Levereth Hudson, USN (11 May 1794 – 15 October 1862) was a United States Navy officer in the first half of the 19th century.

Career
Hudson was born 11 May 1794 in Brooklyn. His first service afloat was in the Mediterranean Squadron under Commodore William Bainbridge in the schooner  and sloop-of-war   from 1815 to 1817.

Hudson was appointed midshipman 1 January 1816. In 1830–1831, Hudson accompanied Lieutenant Ramsey on a tour to Russia, and then assumed duty at the New York Navy Yard.

In June 1838 he was ordered to command , attached to Commander Charles Wilkes's exploring expedition, second in command overall. After strenuous service in the Antarctic, the South Seas, and along the coast of North America, Peacock was wrecked 18 July 1841 while attempting to cross the bar and enter the Columbia River on Wilkes' orders. Commander Hudson made every effort to free his ship but was forced to leave her, saving all his men and the scientific papers.

In September 1849, after shore and lighthouse duty, he was ordered to command Vincennes, cruising the Pacific until 1852. That August, in conjunction with British ships, he made the first attempt at laying a transatlantic cable. This try was unsuccessful, but a second attempt met with success 10 August 1858. After commanding the Boston Navy Yard in 1858–1862, Captain Hudson was made Inspector of the 3d Light House District. He died 15 October 1862 in Brooklyn, aged 68.

Namesakes
Three ships have been named USS Hudson in his honor.

See also
 European and American voyages of scientific exploration

References

External links
 www.history.navy.mil: DANFS biography of William Hudson

1794 births
1862 deaths
United States Navy officers
People from Brooklyn
People of the United States Exploring Expedition